Chaumont-Porcien is a commune in the Ardennes department in northern France.

Population

History
After his travel to the tumb of Jesus, in the 6th century, . When he arrived at the forest of Chaumont-Porcien (which no longer exists), he saw the "Bald Mount", called like this because there were no trees on it, whereas the forest covered all the rest of the landscape. Berthauld became Saint-Berthauld, because he spread the God's word in an pagan area. After his dead, an abbey was built. Destroyed many times, there is nothing left. Thanks to Isidore Fressancourt, a chapel was built in 1876, on the "Bald Mount", still standing, and a way to discover histories and legends of "Porcien".

See also
Communes of the Ardennes department

References

Communes of Ardennes (department)
Ardennes communes articles needing translation from French Wikipedia